Lar National Park (Persian پارک ملی لار park-e melli-e lar) is a protected area in Mazandaran Province in northern Iran.

Geography
 The  park is in the Central Alborz mountain range, at the foot of Mount Damavand.

It has been a national park since 1976 and a protected area since 1982 by the Iran Department of Environment. Since 1991 hunting has been prohibited.

The Lar Dam and reservoir is located within the park.

The park is accessible by car via Haraz road (Road 77).

Flora and fauna
One of the rare species of the fish family Salmonidae is native to this area. Other notable flora and fauna of the park are:
 Flora: liquorice, Cichorium, Thymus vulgaris, Heracleum persicum, St John's wort, borage, shallot, galbanum and multiple species of fungus
 Birds: grey partridge, cormorant, heron and eagle
 Mammals: goat, leopard, gray wolf, bear, wild boar, jackal and fox
 Herpetofauna: monitor lizard, lizard and frog

Central Alborz mountain range map

References

External links

National parks of Iran
Alborz (mountain range)
Geography of Mazandaran Province
Amol County
Tourist attractions in Amol
Tourist attractions in Mazandaran Province